The 2003 Louisiana–Monroe Indians football team represented the University of Louisiana at Monroe in the 2003 NCAA Division I-A college football season. The Indians offense scored 239 points while the defense allowed 467 points.

Schedule

References

Louisiana–Monroe
Louisiana–Monroe Warhawks football seasons
Louisiana–Monroe Indians football